Dumb Patrol is a 1964 Warner Bros. Looney Tunes cartoon short directed by Gerry Chiniquy. It was released on January 18, 1964, and stars Bugs Bunny and Yosemite Sam. Director Gerry Chiniquy was a longtime animator in Friz Freleng's unit. The cartoon is set during World War I opening 'somewhere in France' in 1917, and it also commemorates the 50th anniversary of WWI.

The title is an allusion to The Dawn Patrol, a 1930 movie by Howard Hawks that also deals with World War I pilots. The same title was also used for an unrelated, early Looney Tunes short starring Bosko, released in 1931.

Dumb Patrol does not fall into the normal pattern found in most other Bugs Bunny cartoon shorts. Bugs is not disturbed from a serene state as in most of his other shorts. Also, being a military pilot, he is the attacker, reversing his normal role of the victim. Yosemite Sam had previously been killed off in his previous short, Devil's Feud Cake (though because this film is set in the past it can be argued that this does not create an explicit continuity error, although Sam dies at the end of this cartoon as well)

This marks the final pairing of Bugs and Yosemite Sam, as well as the final appearance of the latter, one of the only three cartoons to feature both Bugs and Porky together, and the final time Porky appears without Daffy Duck.

Plot
In 1917, somewhere in France during World War I, the men of the French Air Force assemble to determine who must rid the skies of the enemy pilot, Baron Sam Von Schpamm. A drawing straws game begins resulting in Porky Pig (addressed as Captain Smedley in this cartoon) selected for the mission. Next day, at dawn, while Porky is suiting up for the flight (whistling Mademoiselle from Armentières), Bugs Bunny knocks him out with a brick and takes his place, because Porky has a family (" . . . a wife and 6 piglets!").

Meanwhile, somewhere in Germany, Sam (Yosemite Sam) is awarded an Iron Cross for his service. Sam, however, is sick of receiving these and would prefer a well-deserved long furlough. Flying over, Bugs drops him a small bouquet of flowers and a poem. Sam reads and is insulted – Bugs has written "Baron" with a small "B" and claims the Big "B" is in the flowers. When Sam looks at the flowers, a bee flies out and stings his nose. Sam has trouble getting his biplane started but, after confronting the plane and finally taking flight, Sam catches up to Bugs. Bugs pulls up into the clouds. Sam orders him out but doesn't watch where he's going. He crashes into a mountain and starts ranting in German as his plane spirals toward the ground and crashes again.

After hitting the ground, Sam runs back to the airfield and grabs another fighter plane. While he looks for Bugs, Bugs comes up behind and buzz-saws through Sam's plane. In his third attempt, Sam begins shooting at Bugs with a machine gun; Bugs not only dodges but also flies by in all directions and from different angles. Sam's shooting becomes indiscriminate and ends up shearing his own plane to bits, leaving only the undercarriage which becomes a unicycle when he lands. Sam then takes to the skies in a bomber. Having sighted and targeted Bugs, he releases the bombs, but he falls with them and gets caught in the resultant ground explosion.

Sam turns to a small monoplane, which at the push of a lever transforms into a fierce fighting machine quad-plane loaded with engines and machine guns. Sam pulls the switch to full power, but this rips the plane into three parts, causing him to fall to his demise in the ammunition dump. Bugs remarks that he has heard of Hells Angels, but he never thought he would see one. The final scene shows Sam in a devil's suit, playing a harp and floating skyward.

See also
List of American films of 1964
 List of Bugs Bunny cartoons
 List of Yosemite Sam cartoons
 List of Porky Pig cartoons

References

External links

 

1964 films
1964 animated films
1964 short films
Looney Tunes shorts
Warner Bros. Cartoons animated short films
American aviation films
Films set in 1917
Films set in France
Films set in Germany
Military humor in film
Western Front (World War I) films
Films scored by William Lava
Bugs Bunny films
Porky Pig films
Films directed by Gerry Chiniquy
1960s Warner Bros. animated short films
Yosemite Sam films
1960s English-language films